Anne Juel is a physicist known for her research on fluid mechanics, the dynamics of surfaces in fluids, instability in fluid dynamics, viscous fingering, and convection. She has also studied the way ribbons curl when a scissor blade is run along them. She is Professor of Fluid Dynamics in the School of Physics & Astronomy at the University of Manchester, where she directs the Manchester Centre for Nonlinear Dynamics.

Education and career
Juel earned a Diplôme d'études universitaires générales in mathematics and physics at Pierre and Marie Curie University in 1991, a master's degree in physics jointly between Pierre and Marie Curie University and the École normale supérieure (Paris) in 1994, and a Diplôme d'études approfondies in the physics of liquids at Pierre and Marie Curie University in 1994. She earned a doctorate (D.Phil.) at the University of Oxford in 1998.

After postdoctoral research at the University of Texas at Austin and the University of Manchester, she joined the University of Manchester School of Mathematics in 2001, and moved to the School of Physics & Astronomy in 2014.

Recognition
In 2019, Juel was named a Fellow of the American Physical Society (APS), after a nomination from the APS Division of Fluid Dynamics, "for fundamental contributions to the understanding of instabilities and dynamics of free surfaces, interfaces, and bubbles, gained by combining precision laboratory experiments with mathematical modeling".

References

External links
Home page

Year of birth missing (living people)
Living people
Women physicists
Alumni of the University of Oxford
Academics of the University of Manchester
Fellows of the American Physical Society
21st-century physicists